The 60th Annual Mobil 1 Twelve Hours of Sebring was the 60th running of the 12 Hours of Sebring, an auto race held at the Sebring International Raceway from 15–17 March 2012. The race served as the opening round for both the inaugural FIA World Endurance Championship and American Le Mans Series seasons.  The field of 64 entries was divided into nine classes: five from the American Le Mans Series and four from the World Endurance Championship.

Qualifying

Qualifying result
Pole position winners in each class are marked in bold.

Notes
 — The No. 29 car of Gulf Racing Middle East was excluded for not meeting the minimum required time in practice/qualifying.

Race

Race result
Class winners in bold.  Cars failing to complete 70% of winner's distance (227 laps) marked as not classified (NC).

References

12 Hours of Sebring
Sebring
Sebring
Sebring
12 Hours Of Sebring